Marcel Antonius Christianus Beumer (born 12 March 1969 in Ede) is a track cyclist from the Netherlands. He competed in the men's team pursuit at the 1988 Summer Olympics, finishing 12th.

See also
 List of Dutch Olympic cyclists

References

1969 births
Dutch male cyclists
Olympic cyclists of the Netherlands
Cyclists at the 1988 Summer Olympics
People from Ede, Netherlands
Living people
Cyclists from Gelderland